The untitled Captain America–Black Panther video game is an upcoming action-adventure game first developed and published by Skydance New Media from Skydance Media, and is based on Marvel Comics characters Captain America and Black Panther, setting against an original narrative that derives from the long-running comic book mythology and various adaptations in other media. The story will take place across Paris, France and the nation of Wakanda during the height of World War II, with the organization Hydra appearing as the main antagonistic force.

The game was jointly announced by Skydance and Marvel Games in October 2021 as the first project to be produced from the former studio, alongside the involvement of studio heads Amy Hennig and Julian Beak as producers, with television and comics writer Marc Bernardin confirmed as writing the game alongside Hennig the following month. The game was officially teased in September 2022.

Gameplay 
The game will be an action-adventure game where players will control an ensemble of four characters. In addition to the main protagonists Steve Rogers / Captain America and Azzuri / Black Panther, Howling Commandos member Gabriel Jones and Nanali, the leader of the Wakandan Spy Network, will also be playable.

Development 
In November 2019, Skydance Media tapped video game director and writer Amy Hennig to establish a new games division within the company. In October 2021, the games division, now fully unveiled as Skydance New Media, would announce that the studio's first major project would be "a narrative-driven, blockbuster action-adventure game" developed in collaboration with Marvel Games, and featuring an original story. The following month, Marvel Comics writer and television producer Marc Bernardin revealed that he was involved as a writer for the game, confirming that he had "spent the better part of a year in the story mines" creating the game's narrative.

In August 2022, Marvel's parent corporation The Walt Disney Company announced their intentions to showcase a slate of video games based on their IP at the joint Disney & Marvel Games Showcase, which would be taking place in conjunction with the company's annual D23 Expo in person and through broadcast on multiple streaming platforms. Alongside the announcement, Disney stated that the panel would also debut a "sneak peek" at Skydance New Media's Marvel title, which was described as being an "ensemble game". The game was officially teased during the showcase on September 9, 2022. Preliminary details on the project confirmed prior reports that it would be set during World War II and that Captain America and Azzuri / Black Panther would feature as the main characters in the ensemble, alongside Gabriel Jones of the Howling Commandos unit and Nanali, leader of the Wakandan Spy Network, while the Hydra organization would serve as the main villains. Actress Janina Gavankar is confirmed to have a role in the game.

References

External links 
 Games page on Marvel.com

Upcoming video games
Video games based on Marvel Comics
Action-adventure games
Black Panther (Marvel Comics) in other media
Video games based on Captain America
Video games developed in the United States
Video games set in a fictional country
Video games set in Africa
Video games set in Paris
Video games set in the 1940s
Video games about World War II alternate histories
Skydance Media games
Skydance New Media games
Superhero crossover video games